The Music Builds Tour was a 23-show festival-style concert tour spanning three months in late 2008. Rock bands Switchfoot and Robert Randolph and the Family Band, along with Third Day and Jars of Clay co-headlined the event.

As such, the tour benefited local Habitat for Humanity chapters in the tour cities, through a program combining "Hollywood For Habitat For Humanity," the concert production company Live Nation, and the bands. The tour has been depicted in two concert films, Third Day's Live Revelation and Switchfoot's The Best Yet Live in Nashville. One music video was shot during the tour, that being the second version of Switchfoot's "This Is Home."

Itinerary
The tour began with a kick-off show on April 21, 2008 at the Wild Horse Saloon in Nashville, Tennessee.

The main tour began August 21 at the DTE Energy Music Theatre in Clarkston, Michigan and concluded at the Broomfield Event Center in Denver, Colorado on October 12.

Stage design
The tour played mostly in large arenas and amphitheaters. It featured an elaborate stage set-up, which included one large LED display screen behind the performers  and two video screens overhead. The tour, keeping with the festival theme, also featured a side stage that featured bands such as Red.

Philanthropy efforts
The tour benefited Habitat for Humanity's home building program in several different ways. For one, the artists on the tour donate $1 to the charity for each ticket sold during the tour. Additionally, the funds that were raised from various ticket auctions, special merchandise items, and event packages were allocated to help fund Habitat for Humanity in each tour stop city. The bands also were found at the various Habitat for Humanity build sites during the tour personally helping in the construction of Habitat for Humanity-sponsored homes, and also invited some of the current and future homeowners to attend the shows.

Tour dates

References

External links
 Official Tour Website
 Tour Press Release

Switchfoot concert tours
2008 concert tours
Habitat for Humanity
Christian concert tours